In enzymology, a L-threonate 3-dehydrogenase is an enzyme that catalyzes the chemical reaction

L-threonate + NAD+  3-dehydro-L-threonate + NADH + H+

Thus, the two substrates of this enzyme are L-threonate and NAD+, whereas its 3 products are 3-dehydro-L-threonate, NADH, and H+.

This enzyme belongs to the family of oxidoreductases, specifically those acting on the CH-OH group of donor with NAD+ or NADP+ as acceptor. The systematic name of this enzyme class is L-threonate:NAD+ 3-oxidoreductase. Other names in common use include threonate dehydrogenase, and L-threonic acid dehydrogenase. This enzyme participates in ascorbate and aldarate metabolism.

References

 

EC 1.1.1
NADH-dependent enzymes
Enzymes of unknown structure